Barker Dam, also known as the Big Horn Dam, is a dam with water-storage reservoir located in Joshua Tree National Park in California. The dam was constructed by early cattlemen, including C. O. Barker, in 1900. It was raised in 1949 by rancher William F. Keys. It is situated between Queen Valley and the Wonderland of Rocks near the Wall Street Mill. It is a gathering place for desert wildlife, including many species of birds and desert bighorn sheep. Visitors can reach the dam via a short loop trail from a nearby parking lot off Barker Dam Road, and can see Native American petroglyphs a short distance to the west. There is also good bouldering on side trails near the dam. The park offers a Barker Dam Nature Hike led by a ranger.

The lowest  of the dam, the original portion, was constructed of concrete surfaced with stone on the downstream side. The height of the dam was raised an additional six feet with concrete in 1949–1950. The dam has several indentations. An inscription at top reads: "Big Horn Dam Built by Willis Keys, W.F. Keyes, Phyllis M. Keys, 1949–1950."

Hiking trails
The Barker Dam Loop trail is  round trip and has little elevation gain. It goes from the parking lot at Barker Dam, past the dam and several good boulder climbing areas and a wall of petroglyphs. The trail offers good birding near the lake and at several spots along the trail that are surrounded by brush. It is a popular trail and is crowded midday.

Barker Dam is listed on the National Register of Historic Places.

See also
List of lakes in California

References

External links

 

Dams in California
National Register of Historic Places in Joshua Tree National Park
Dams completed in 1900
Dams on the National Register of Historic Places in California
National Register of Historic Places in Riverside County, California
History of the Mojave Desert region
Landmarks of Riverside County, California
Petroglyphs in California